Damon Thayer (born September 16, 1967) is an American politician. He is a Republican member of the Kentucky Senate, representing the 17th District.

Thayer was raised in Grayling, Michigan. He graduated from Michigan State University in 1989 with a B.A. in communications. He is the owner of Thayer Communications and Consulting LLC, a marketing communications firm. Thayer was vice chairman of the Republican Party of Kentucky from 1999 to 2004.

In 2003, Thayer was elected to the Kentucky Senate in a special election to represent the 17th District, which encompasses Grant, Scott and southern Kenton Counties. In 2017, he was selected Senate Majority Floor Leader. As a member of Senate leadership, he serves on the Committee on Committees, the Rules Committee, and the Legislative Research Commission.

He appeared on The Daily Show in 2013.

In March 2020 during the first session of the Kentucky Senate since Democrat Andy Beshear took office as governor, Thayer proposed legislation to limit the powers of the executive branch.

References

1967 births
21st-century American politicians
Republican Party Kentucky state senators
Living people
Michigan State University alumni